The Company's in Love is a 1932 German comedy film directed by Max Ophüls and starring Gustav Fröhlich, Anny Ahlers and Lien Deyers.

It was shot at the Staaken Studios in Berlin and on location in Switzerland. The film's sets were designed by Robert Neppach and Erwin Scharf.

Plot
When a temperamental film star storms off the set, a production crew shooting in the Alps decide to recruit a local post office employee to replace her. Complications ensue once they return to Berlin as they have all fallen in love with her.

Cast
Gustav Fröhlich as Werner Loring jr. - deputy. Director of Ideal Tonfilm
Anny Ahlers as Peggy Barling - Film star
Lien Deyers as Gretl Krummbichler - Post office employee
Ernö Verebes as Heinrich Pulver - Assistant Director
José Wedorn as Leo Lamberti - Chamber singer
Leonard Steckel as Harry Bing - Director
Hubert von Meyerinck as Fritz Willner - Screenwriter
Fritz Steiner as Toni Bauer - Composer
Hermann Krehan as Karl Martini - Cinematographer
Werner Finck as Franz Klingemüller - Swiss Post Board of Management

References

External links

1932 comedy films
German comedy films
Films of the Weimar Republic
Films directed by Max Ophüls
Films about filmmaking
Films set in Berlin
Films scored by Bruno Granichstaedten
Films shot at Staaken Studios
German black-and-white films
1930s German-language films
1930s German films